Astroblepus festae is a species of catfish of the family Astroblepidae. It can be found on south Ecuador.

Named in honor of Italian naturalist Enrico Festa (1868-1939), who collected the type specimen.

References

Bibliography
Eschmeyer, William N., ed. 1998. Catalog of Fishes. Special Publication of the Center for Biodiversity Research and Information, num. 1, vol. 1–3. California Academy of Sciences. San Francisco, California, United States. 2905. .

Astroblepus
Taxa named by George Albert Boulenger
Fish described in 1898
Freshwater fish of Ecuador